This was the 1994–95 Balkan League season, the first season of the multi-national ice hockey league. Six teams participated in the league, and Partizan Belgrade of Serbia won the championship.

Regular season

External links
Season on hockeyarchives.info

2
Balkan League (ice hockey) seasons